Ahmad al-Qurashi or Ahmed El-Gorashy Taaha Arabic (1942–October 1964) known also as El-shaheed (or Martyr) El-Gorashy, born in El-Garrassa village close to El-Mannaqel town, Al Jazirah State of Sudan, was a student in Khartoum University who was killed by the police in October 1964 at the time of a huge uprising, the Thoraat October or October Revolution, which led to overthrown of the Ibrahim Abboud military regime.

Al-Qurashi got his intermediate education in El-dlennj School in El-dlennj town located in the Nuba Mountains region. In 1958, al-Qurashi attended El-shir Secondary School in El-fashir town (el-fashir secondary school founded in 1957). He attended Khartoum University in the early 1960s.

Al-Qurashi was shot by police, during an invasion of student accommodation by police force (the students accommodation known as barracks because it once was the accommodation of the British Army when Sudan was still a colony). Al-Qurashi his accommodation called El-Dander which changed to El-Gorashy after his death and till today (today the former barracks have been the female student dormitories since 1997). There was another student killed by police before El-Gorashy on 25 November 1964) the student name Babekir Hussan Abedel el- hafiz Arabic بابكر حسن عبد لحفيظ
Baabekir originally from Omdurman lived in quarter called Wad Droo.

References 
 New York Times profile of the October Revolution

People shot dead by law enforcement officers in Sudan
1942 births
1964 deaths